The Atlanta Centre is an office skyscraper in San Juan, Metro Manila, Philippines. It is also the highest building in the city with a total height of 179 metres from the ground to its architectural spire.

The building has 35 floors above ground, including a 10-level parking area. It has 6 Otis elevators, and is equipped with a centralized PABX/ LAN communication networks plus a Building Management System (BMS).

Location

The Atlanta Centre is located along Annapolis Street, well inside the Greenhills area and the city's only skyline area. It is also just a stone throw away from the well-known Greenhills Shopping Center.

Related Events

Atlanta Centre was known as the place where Nida Blanca, a well-known Filipino actress, was found dead on 7 November 2001. She was found inside a car in the building's parking area.

At about 6:00 AM on 16 December 2008, a fire broke out on the 7th floor of the building. No one was reported injured since office workers have not yet arrived in the area. The building's curtain walls on the said level were destroyed by fire fighters for the trapped smoke to come out.

See also

 San Juan

References

External links
 Atlanta Centre at Skyscraperpage.com
 Atlanta Centre at Emporis

Skyscrapers in Metro Manila
Office buildings in Metro Manila
Buildings and structures in San Juan, Metro Manila
Office buildings completed in 1998
20th-century architecture in the Philippines